Lake Delaware is a small reservoir located southwest of the hamlet of Bovina Center in Delaware County, New York. Lake Delaware drains north via an unnamed creek which flows into the Little Delaware River.

See also
 List of lakes in New York

References 

Lakes of New York (state)
Lakes of Delaware County, New York
Reservoirs in Delaware County, New York